VA-923 has the following meanings:
 Attack Squadron 923 (U.S. Navy), now inactive (see List_of_inactive_United_States_Navy_aircraft_squadrons#Attack_squadrons)
State Route 923 (Virginia)